Narandia Union is a union of Kalihati Upazila, Tangail District, Bangladesh. It is situated 20 km north of Tangail, The district headquarter.

Demographics
According to Population Census 2011 performed by Bangladesh Bureau of Statistics, the total population of Narandia Union is 31,204. There are 7,520 households in total.

Education
The literacy rate of Narandia Union is 46.2% (male-49.1%, female-43.6%).

See also
 Union Councils of Tangail District

References

Populated places in Dhaka Division
Populated places in Tangail District
Unions of Kalihati Upazila